Damage Inc may refer to:
 Damage Incorporated, a 1997 computer game
 Damage Inc. Pacific Squadron WWII, a 2012 combat flight sim
 "Damage, Inc.", a song from Metallica's third album, Master of Puppets
 Damage, Inc. Tour, the name of a Metallica concert tour